Polyachkovo is a rural locality in Ivanchikovsky Selsoviet Rural Settlement, Lgovsky District, Kursk Oblast, Russia. Population:

Geography 
The village is located on the Prutishche River in the basin of the Seym, 62 km from the Russia–Ukraine border, 56 km north-west of Kursk, 9 km north-east of the district center – the town Lgov, 1.5 km from the selsoviet center – Ivanchikovo.

 Climate
Polyachkovo has a warm-summer humid continental climate (Dfb in the Köppen climate classification).

Transport 

The rural locality is situated 63 km from Kursk Vostochny Airport, 150 km from Belgorod International Airport and 266 km from Voronezh Peter the Great Airport.

References

Notes

Sources

Rural localities in Lgovsky District